Toshbuloq is an urban-type settlement in Namangan Region, Uzbekistan. It is the administrative center of Namangan District.

References

Populated places in Namangan Region
Urban-type settlements in Uzbekistan